1492 epopea lirica d'America is an opera in four acts by Antonio Braga. Composed from 1985 to 1989, it stage premiered on 13 October 1992 at the Teatro Nacional in Santo Domingo to mark the Columbus Quincentenary.

Recordings
 1492 epopea lirica d'America with the Orchestra Nazionale di San Domingo and conductor Carlos Piantini, Jolanta Omilian (soprano), Salvatore Ragonese, Danilo Serraiocco (bass-baritone), and Gwendolyn Jones (soprano). Released in 1994 on the Bongiovanni label.

References

Operas set in the United States
Operas
1992 operas
Italian-language operas
Operas by Antonio Braga
Fiction set in 1492
Operas set in the 15th century
Cultural depictions of Christopher Columbus
Operas set in Spain